The 2017 USA Indoor Track and Field Championships was held at the Albuquerque Convention Center in Albuquerque, New Mexico. Organized by USA Track and Field (USATF), the three-day competition took place from March 3 to March 5 and served as the national championships in track and field for the United States.  All marks in the competition are considered at altitude.

Men

Women

References

Complete Results
2017 USATF Indoor Track and Field Championships Home Page

External links
Official USATF website

2017
Track and field indoor
USA Indoor Track and Field Championships
USA Indoor Track and Field Championships
Sports in Albuquerque, New Mexico
Track and field in New Mexico
Events in Albuquerque, New Mexico